Konstantin Ivanovich Skryabin (– 17 September 1972) was a Soviet scientist in the field of Helminthology, academician of the USSR Academy of Sciences (1939), academician of USSR Academy of Medical Sciences, Hero of Socialist Labor (1958), winner of Stalin Prize and Lenin Prize. He was a founder of the helminthology school, and an author of landmark books on helminths in Soviet Union.

Life 
In 1905 he graduated from Dorpat (Tartu) Veterinary Institute. From 1905 to 1911 Skryabin worked as a veterinary physician in Aulie-Ata and Shymkent. In 1912 to 1914 he was sent on assignment mission to Germany, Switzerland, and France. From 1915 to 1917, Skryabin worked as a researcher in the Central Veterinary Laboratory of Saint Petersburg. In 1917 he became a professor of the Parasitology Department of Don Veterinary Institute in Novocherkassk. He was a Head of the Department of the Moscow Veterinary Institute (1920-1925) and (1933-1941), and at the same time Head of Helminthology Division of the Central Tropical Institute (1921-1941).

Eponymous taxa 
About 40 genera were named after Skryabin:

Skrjabinella
Skrjabinodentus
Skrjabinocercella
Skrjabinoeces
Skrjabinostrongylus
Skrjabinobilharzia
Skrjabinobronema
Skrjabinocapillaria
Skrjabinocara
Skrjabinocerca

Skrjabinocercella
Skrjabinocerina
Skrjabinochona
Skrjabinochora 
Skrjabinocladorchis
Skrjabinoclava
Skrjabinocoelum
Skrjabinocta
Skrjabinodendrium
Skrjabinodera

Skrjabinodon
Skrjabinoeces
Skrjabinofilaria
Skrjabinolecithum
Skrjabinomermis
Skrjabinomerus
Skrjabinonchus
Skrjabinoparaksis
Skrjabinophora
Skrjabinophyetus

Skrjabinoplagiorchis
Skrjabinoporus
Skrjabinopsolus
Skrjabinoptera
Skrjabinorhynchus
Skrjabinosomum
Skrjabinostrongylus
Skrjabinotaenia
Skrjabinotaurus
Skrjabinotrema
Skrjabinovermis
Skrjabinozoum

References 

1878 births
1972 deaths
Scientists from Saint Petersburg
Zoologists from the Russian Empire
Full Members of the USSR Academy of Sciences
Academicians of the USSR Academy of Medical Sciences
Academicians of the VASKhNIL
Burials at Novodevichy Cemetery
Recipients of the Order of Lenin
Heroes of Socialist Labour
Soviet parasitologists
Soviet zoologists
Foreign members of the Serbian Academy of Sciences and Arts